Maquette is a puzzle-adventure video game developed by Graceful Decay and published by Annapurna Interactive. The game takes place in a recursive world where every action on a table is recreated in the larger area outside. The game was released on March 2, 2021, for PlayStation 4, PlayStation 5, and Microsoft Windows, and is set to release in Q4 2022 for Nintendo Switch, Xbox One, and Xbox Series X/S.

Reception 

Maquette received mostly positive reviews from critics, who praised its story, but criticized its simplistic puzzles. The game has a Metacritic score of 71 on PC, and 70 on PlayStation 5.

Chris Tapsell of Eurogamer praised the recursive world of Maquette, "Solving these puzzles is, mostly, a delight. The brilliance of that basic principle lingers... there's more emphasis on step-by-step logic here, and less on tricks of perception. It's cleverly twisted and re-presented in slightly different forms, This is the reward of a good puzzle... and in Maquette the moments you find the right bridge or ramp or change of relative size are often full of it." Tapsell also noted frustration with some puzzles, writing "Similarly though, where Maquette diverts from that striking premise is where it starts to wobble. More than once, I found the final part of a puzzle to be a bit of a non-sequitur — arbitrarily pullable levers to pull, invisible ledges to reach, one stray object... left lying about as inadvertently time-wasting bait, when everything else has a purpose."

Rock Paper Shotgun's Ed Thorn enjoyed the game's puzzle mechanics, feeling that they were a bit simplistic, but enjoyable. " It'll give you those "aha!" moments, all of which relate to making something big, then small - or vice versa. You need to pay close attention to details in your environment... There's a bit of repetition early on, with an endless array of keys and orbs to fiddle around with, but as time goes by things do get a bit more creative." He strongly disliked the story of the game, feeling that it was filled with tropes and poor writing. "It's like the devs tried to nail down real and mundane so hard, they somehow hammered through the non-fiction wall into hyper-fictitious. Everything is so idyllic, and predictable, and I am convinced no human has ever had a relationship like Michael and Kenzie."

See also
A Fisherman's Tale, a VR game based around the same mechanic

References 

2021 video games
Annapurna Interactive games
Windows games
PlayStation 4 games
PlayStation 5 games
Puzzle video games
Adventure games
Video games developed in the United States
Single-player video games